Amar Noorie (also spelled as Amar Noori) is an Indian singer and actress who works in Punjabi-language films. She was married to Sardool Sikander, a noted Punjabi singer.

Early life and career

https://upload.wikimedia.org/wikipedia/commons/3/30/Amar_noorie.jpg

Amar Noorie was born on 23 May 1967 in village Rangeelpur, Ropar District in Punjab. She was married to Sardool Sikander on 30 January 1993. She lives in GTB Nagar, Khanna, Distt. Ludhiana but now currently they live village Bullepur, Khanna. Punjab Noorie started professional singing at an early age when she was only 9 years old. Her father Roshan Sagar was a singer. She started singing with Punjabi singer Didar Sandhu in 1981, and made her first recording when she was only 13. In 1986, she met Sardool Sikander and they started singing together and later got married. Amar Noorie Always Loved Yellow Colour. Later she started acting and played lead and important roles in many Punjabi films. Her first acting break came in 1988 in a landmark TV series "Eho Hamara Jeevna", directed by Gurbir Singh Grewal (based on a novel of Dalip Kaur Tiwana)

https://upload.wikimedia.org/wikipedia/commons/8/8f/Amar_Noorie_with_her_son_Tejasbir_Singh.jpg

Filmography

Noorie acted in many Punjabi films and also worked as a playback singer for many of them. Here are some of her notable films:
Gabhroo Punjab Da (1986) ... Live performance
Jatt Punjab Da (1990) 
Vaisakhi (1991)
Udeekan Sain Diyaan (1991) 
 
Badla Jatti Da (1991) ... Noorie
Jorr Jatt Da (1991)
Dil Da Maamla (1992)
Putt Sardaran De (1992) 
Zakhmi Sher (1996) 
Panchayat (1996)
Mela (1997) 
Jang Da Maidan (1997)
Jee Aayan Nu (2003).
Dil Apna Punjabi (2006)
Mel Karade Rabba (2010)
Tere Ishq Nachaya (2010) 
Pata Nahi Rabb Kehdeyan Rangan Ch Raazi (2012)
Daddy Cool Munde Fool (2013)
Shahid-e-mohabbat Punjabi film (2005)
ALBUMS
Yaari Pardesian Di (1989) 
Jija ve teri Sali Nachdi (1988) 
Nau Sas Da Mukabla (1988) 
Gora Rang Deyi Na Rabba (1989) 
Navi Vyahi Nachi (1988) 
Dudh pee la Balma (1988)
Sad Gayian Gavandana (1989) 
Reela Di Dukaan (1989) 
Nachna Sakht Mana Hai (1989) 
Gidha Junction (1990) 
Bhangra Beats (1991) 
Mela Meliyan Da (1997) 
Mela Baisakhi Da (1998) 
Hello Hello 2000 (2000) 
Kala Doriya 99 (1999) 
Husan Punjaban Da (1997) 
Kalli Beh Ke Sochi (1997) 
Ik Main Hova Ik Tu Hoven (2009) 
Addi Tappa (1996) 
Chori Teri Fadi gayi (1996) 
Nakhra 96 (1996) 
Mittra Nu Maar geya (1996)
Na maat zalma ve (1986) 
Fatak Kotkapure Da (1985) 
Jhanjar Di Chhankar (1999) 
Gali Gali Chhankata (2001) 
Phulkari (2000)
Bhangra 2000 (2000)
Lara Lappa (1992)
Panth Khalsa (1998)
Sanu vi chithiya payi datiye (1992)

References

External links

Punjabi-language singers
Actresses in Punjabi cinema
Living people
20th-century Indian actresses
21st-century Indian actresses
Year of birth missing (living people)